No go or Nogo may refer to:

Nogo A, B, C, or Nogo-66, isoforms of a neurite outgrowth inhibitory protein Reticulon 4.
No-go area, a military or political term for an area to which access is restricted or travel is dangerous
No-go pill, a military term for a hypnotic medication taken by soldiers to ensure they are well rested for missions
go/no go, a process or device used in quality control
Go-NoGo gauge, an inspection tool used to check a workpiece against its allowed tolerances
No-go theorem, a theorem that shows that an idea is not possible even though it may look attractive
Nogo, an alternative name for an African tree more commonly called Lecomtedoxa
Nogo (drum), a Korean drum

People
Rajko Nogo (1945–2022), Serbian poet and literary critic
Salif Nogo (born 1986), Burkinabé-French footballer
Srđan Nogo (born 1981), Serbian politician

Places
Australia
Nogo River, a tributary of the Burnett River
United States
Nogo, Arkansas, a small, unincorporated community
Nogo, Missouri, a former town in Greene County

Entertainment
"Say No Go", a single by De La Soul
"No-Go Showboat", a song written for the American rock band The Beach Boys from their album Little Deuce Coupe
Hikaru no Go, a popular Japanese anime and manga
Hikaru no Go 3, a video game of the board game genre released in 2003 by Konami
Nogo (instrument), a traditional Korean drum set

See also
Go (disambiguation)